"Turn to Me", is a song by Australian singer-songwriter, Vanessa Amorosi, released in December 2001 as the lead single from her second album, Turn to Me. The song peaked at number 80 on the ARIA singles chart.

Track listing 
 CD single
 "Turn to Me"  (Single Version) - 3:36
 "Turn to Me" (Alternative Version)  - 3:37
 "Turn to Me" (Extended Version)  - 5:34
 "Turn to Me" (Animated Video Clip)  - 3:43

Charts

Release history

References 

2001 singles
Vanessa Amorosi songs
Songs written by Vanessa Amorosi
2001 songs